HMS Jalouse was a  of the British Royal Navy launched in 1809 and sold in 1819. She participated in the capture of a French privateer, but spent most of her active service escorting convoys. The Navy sold her in 1819.

Career
The Navy commissioned Jalouse in June 1809 for the Irish Station and under the command of Commander Henry G. Morris. Choice, Clark, master, had been sailing from Oporto to London when the French privateer Dougay Trouin captured her. Jalouse recaptured Choice on 23 November and sent her to Cork, Ireland.

On 28 January 1810  and Jalouse chased the 14-gun French privateer brig Charles, but lost her in thick fog. The next day Phoenix discovered Charles anchored close under the French coast. A cutting out expedition then went in with boats. Charles had a crew of 70 men, who resisted with grapeshot and small arms fire, killing one seaman on Phoenix and wounding another; Jalouse had no casualties Still, the boats succeeded in taking Charles, where they found two English masters and 13 seamen who the privateers had taken out of vessels a few days previously. One of the vessels Charles had captured was David, Wilkinson, master, which had been sailing from Newfoundland to Waterford. Her captors sent Charles into Plymouth.

On 3 November 1811 Jalouse departed Cork to join with the convoy that departed for Lisbon on the 27 October, after experiencing most dreadful weather.

In September 1812 Commander Abraham Lowe replaced Morris. On 23 December 1812 Jalouse arrived at Cork, after seeing a convoy to Cadiz and a month's cruise, during which time she captured, to the westward of the Great Belt, two American brigs.

On 23 May 1813, the American privateer Paul Jones captured Betsey, Roberts, master, which had been sailing from Liverpool to Lisbon. Jalouse escorted her convoy as far as Gibraltar and returned to England on 9 July. She then went into quarantine.

On 7 June 1814 Lowe received promotion to post captain and Commander James Bashford replaced him. Lieutenant John Undrell received promotion to Commander on 13 June 1815 and took command of Jalouse for the Jamaica station. In 1816 Commander Edward Hall replaced Undrell.

Fate
Jalouse was paid-off at Chatham in January 1816. The "Principal Officers and Commissioners of His Majesty's Navy" offered "Jalouse, of 26 guns and, 425 tons", lying at Chatham, for sale on 8 March 1819. She sold there to G. Young on that date for £1,660.

Notes, citations, and references

Notes

Citations

References

External links
 

 

1809 ships
Cormorant-class ship-sloops